The Royal Order of Munhumutapa, named after the Kingdom of Mutapa, is a national order in Zimbabwe. The Order is conferred upon national citizens and foreign former leaders of the Frontline States in recognition of exemplary support of the independence of Zimbabwe and of Southern Africa.

As of August, 2017 The Royal Order of Munhumutapa has been awarded to these 7 individuals. Tanzania is the only country that has had two recipients of the award.

References 

 
 
 
 

Orders, decorations, and medals of Zimbabwe
Politics of Zimbabwe